The Pana-Wave Laboratory is a  Japanese new religious group or "Shinshūkyō". Estimates of membership range from several hundred to 1,200.

Origin 
Pana-Wave is an offshoot of a religious group called Chino-Shoho ("True Law of Chino") based in Shibuya, Tokyo, founded by a woman called Yuko Chino in 1977 and combining elements of Christianity, Buddhism and New Age doctrines.

In the mid-1980s, members calling themselves the "scientific faction", and warning of the evils of electromagnetic waves (which the group claimed were causing catastrophic environmental destruction and climate change) built the Pana-Wave Laboratory in Fukui Prefecture in an area they believed was less at risk from electromagnetic pollution. Members started to dress only in white in the mid-1990s, in the belief that this would protect them from harmful "scalar electromagnetic waves", which they claimed were being used against them by communists to try to kill their leader.

In 1994 the group formed a convoy of white vans which traveled around rural Japan searching for a place least at risk from harmful electromagnetic radiation and away from power lines, and setting up camp in remote locations for months on end and covering everything in white. They also took their leader Chino when she was ill with cancer into the mountains of Japan to search for a safe place where waves couldn't harm her anymore. They believed that if the waves got to their leader that all of mankind would all at once be destroyed.

Incidents in 2003 
They first attracted attention in March 2003, when they attempted (and failed) to capture Tama-chan, an Arctic seal which had become a national celebrity in Japan since showing up in Tama River in Tokyo the previous year. The group believed that the seal had been led astray by electromagnetic waves, and claimed that doomsday would somehow be averted if the seal was returned to Arctic waters. They had even built two swimming pools, lined in white, in a compound in Yamanashi Prefecture in which to hold the seal until it could be transferred to the Arctic.

The group made national headlines in April when the convoy was ordered by police to move on from a road in Gifu Prefecture and refused, resulting in a stand-off which was reported in the national media. Pana-Wave alleged that a close encounter with an undiscovered 10th planet, predicted for 15 May that year, would cause the Earth's poles to flip over and lead to catastrophic earthquakes and tsunamis which would destroy most of humankind, and that they were looking for a safe location to ride out the catastrophe. TV images showed members dressed completely in white, complete with white hoods, surgical masks and white boots. Their vehicles were decorated with swirl patterns which they believed neutralised the invisible waves, and even the steering wheel was covered in white plaster. Nearby trees, bushes and crash barriers were also covered in white fabric. TV crews were first shunned by members who feared that TV cameras were emitting harmful waves, but were later allowed closer as long as they covered themselves and their equipment in white material.

This camp was eventually broken up by three hundred police, some in riot gear, who threatened to arrest them for obstructing traffic. The convoy moved on, setting up camp intermittently, but many in Japan were unnerved by the group, which evoked memories of Aum Shinrikyo, a religious terrorist group which carried out the deadly sarin gas attack on the Tokyo subway in 1995, and the convoy continued being turned away from village after village. In the lead-up to the supposed doomsday, some one hundred riot police and TV crew followed the highly photogenic convoy around rural Japan for several weeks to keep tabs on their activities.

On 14 May, the day before the predicted doomsday, police raided twelve locations associated with the group on the pretext of minor vehicle registration offences. However, nothing was found which suggested that they posed a danger to society.

When the May 15 doomsday passed with nothing more serious than a minor earthquake in Tokyo which injured one boy who fell off his bed and broke an arm, a member thought to be Chino's second-in-command made a statement that they believed that they had miscalculated the date, and a new date of May 22 was set. However, as this date again passed without incident, media attention faded and the group sank back into obscurity.

On 25 October 2006, Chino died aged 72.

Notes

External links
 Pana-Wave Laboratory homepage
 NY Times article
 The Age - Doomsday cult misses the call
 Photo collection

Japanese new religions
Religious organizations established in the 1980s
Religious organizations based in Japan